Michael Corbett may refer to:

Mike Corbett (ice hockey, born 1942) (1942–2003), ice hockey player in the National Hockey League
Mike Corbett (ice hockey, born 1972), men's hockey head coach
Mike Corbett (Power Rangers), fictional character from Power Rangers
Michael Corbett (judge) (1923–2007), Chief Justice of South Africa
Michael Corbett (actor) (born 1956), played David Kimble on The Young and the Restless from 1986 to 1991
Michael Corbett (spree killer), murderer of Kelsey Grammer's sister